A Splendid Intelligence: The Life of Elizabeth Hardwick is a 2021 book by Cathy Curtis that examines the life of Elizabeth Hardwick. The book has two "positive" reviews, one "rave" review, and nine "mixed" reviews according to review aggregator Book Marks.

References

2021 non-fiction books
English-language books
W. W. Norton & Company books